King Britt (born 1968) is an American educator, DJ and record producer from Philadelphia.

Biography
Britt is a 1986 graduate of Central High School in Philadelphia, Pennsylvania. In 1987, he started working at Tower Records, as a buyer for the singles/import section. His extensive knowledge of dance music made him an in demand buyer in the company. He went on to make many connections in the music community, bringing in records and new labels from all over the world. King attended Temple University.

In 1990, King Britt began his first DJ residency at the Silk City in Philadelphia and the now defunct Revival. These two DJ residencies would help change the course of dance music in Philadelphia and lay the foundation for King's musical future. In collaboration with music partner Josh Wink, King also produced his first commercial release "Tribal Confusion" on dance label Strictly Rhythm. Their musical partnership continued until 2001.

In 1992, he started touring worldwide for the group Digable Planets for two years with a three-month opening slot with Sade. In 1994, Britt and Josh Wink started the label Ovum Recordings. Their first release was a collaboration between King and wordsmith/singer Ursula Rucker called "Supernatural". The song went on to become a staple tune in the US rave scene and is revered as a classic in many countries. Ovum Recordings is still in operation but King resigned from his position in 2001.

In early 1998, under the name Sylk130, King released the neo soul album When the Funk Hits the Fan on Ovum/Columbia Records. This album went to sell over 500,000 copies worldwide and was scheduled to be re-released in 2012 as part of a box set collection for Sylk130. In a favorable review of the 1998 album When the Funk Hits the Fan, Billboard compared his sound to that of Soul II Soul and De La Soul.

In 2001, Britt released Sylk130 Re-Member's Only, which features Alison Moyet, Martin Fry from ABC, Kathy Sledge, Grover Washington Jr, De La Soul and others. It was his last album for Ovum Recordings and Columbia Records as he began to pursue doing more production work.

Britt released Adventures in Lo Fi on London's BBE label in 2003. Guests on the album included Madlib as Quasimoto, De La Soul, Dice Raw, Ivana Santilli and Butterfly from Digable Planets. He produced King Britt Presents: Sister Gertrude Morgan in 2005. A recreation of self-proclaimed bride of christ, Sister Gertrude's original Preservation Hall album gets new life. The record was included in the Michael Mann's 2006 film Miami Vice, on the AdBusters compilation, Live Without Dead Time and the HBO television show True Blood. Still continuing to DJ/produce, King changed his direction and began focusing on techno music and in 2006 released Interpretation under the moniker The Nova Dream Sequence. Released on Munich based label Compost, this record was praised by Derrick May and Carl Craig, including many of the songs in their sets. May also contributed to the liner notes.

Britt won the Pew Fellowship in the Arts for composition in 2007.

Britt and multimedia artists Rucyl started the project 'Saturn Never Sleeps' in 2009. It is an electronic improvisational group as well as a label. They came together to curate an evening of music for the Institute of Contemporary Art in Philadelphia to coincide with a Sun Ra exhibit, that was touring. They soon took the concept further, while they were residents at The Painted Bride Art Center in Philadelphia. Saturn Never Sleeps went on to become a band, label and is curated monthly in Philadelphia.

Intricate Beauty by Britt was released in 2010 on Nervous Recordings. Special guests included Lady Alma, RYAT and Astrid Suryanto, who sings on the club hit "Now". Tim Conley a.k.a. MAST played guitar on the title track "Intricate Beauty". Britt also produced for Canadian rock stars Bedouin Soundclash on the album Light the Horizon.

Britt has remixed for musicians Tori Amos, Miles Davis, Saul Williams and Meredith Monk and Wendy & Lisa.

In 2014, he produced The Phoenix by Fhloston Paradigm for the Hyperdub label. 2016 brought two album projects, Donna by Cassy and Pendulous Moon by the German singer, Clara Hill.

2017 saw the return of the Fhloston Paradigm project with an album After... It featured guest appearances by Nosaj Thing, Ryat, Jacqueline Constance, Moor Mother, Pia Ercole, Stephanie Yu, Alexa Barchini, Kate Faust, Petra, Puerto Rican Space Program and Tim Motzer. In 2017, he also contributed to Gonjasufi's album Mandela Effect.

Curatorial 
In 2014, King curated a day at the MoMA PS1 called Moondance: A Night in the Afrofuture. Since then, his curatorial pursuits have included a series of music inspired events for FringeArts in Philadelphia.

Discography

Albums and production
1998: When the Funk Hits the Fan
2001: Re-Members Only
2002: The Philadelphia Experiment Remixed
2002: Hidden Treasures by Scuba
2002: Black to the Future
2002: Cosmoafrique by ObaFunke
2003: Adventures in Lo-Fi (BBE Records)
2005: Late Night with King Britt 
2005: King Britt Presents: Sister Gertrude Morgan
2006: Nova Dream Sequence: Interpretations
2007: Cosmic Lounge
2007: This Is King Britt
2009: Deep and Sexy 4
2010: The Intricate Beauty
2011: Yesterday's Machine by Saturn Never Sleeps
2014: The Phoenix by Fhloston Paradigm
2015: Cosmosis #1 by Fhloston Paradigm
2015: Cosmosis #2 by Fhloston Paradigm
2016: Pendulous Moon by Clara Hill
2016: Donna by Cassy
2016: What Happened Was...
2017: After... by Fhloston Paradigm

References

External links
  – official site
 

American dance musicians
Remixers
Rappers from Philadelphia
American hip hop DJs
Breakbeat musicians
Living people
Pew Fellows in the Arts
1968 births
21st-century American rappers
Six Degrees Records artists
Central High School (Philadelphia) alumni
Electronic dance music DJs
Barely Breaking Even artists